In mathematics, algebraic geometry and analytic geometry are two closely related subjects. While algebraic geometry studies algebraic varieties, analytic geometry deals with complex manifolds and the more general analytic spaces defined locally by the vanishing of analytic functions of several complex variables. The deep relation between these subjects has numerous applications in which algebraic techniques are applied to analytic spaces and analytic techniques to algebraic varieties.

Main statement 
Let X be a projective complex algebraic variety. Because X is a complex variety, its set of complex points X(C) can be given the structure of a compact complex analytic space. This analytic space is denoted Xan. Similarly, if  is a sheaf on X, then there is a corresponding sheaf  on Xan. This association of an analytic object to an algebraic one is a functor.

is an isomorphism. (Note in particular that  itself is coherent, a result known as the Oka coherence theorem, and also, it was proved in “Faisceaux Algebriques Coherents” that the structure sheaf of the algebraic variety  is coherent.)

Another important statement is as follows: For any coherent sheaf  on an algebraic variety X the homomorphisms

are isomorphisms for all qs. This means that the q-th cohomology group on X is isomorphic to the cohomology group on Xan.

The theorem applies much more generally than stated above (see the formal statement below).  It and its proof have many consequences, such as Chow's theorem, the Lefschetz principle and Kodaira vanishing theorem.

 Background 
Algebraic varieties are locally defined as the common zero sets of polynomials and since polynomials over the complex numbers are holomorphic functions, algebraic varieties over C can be interpreted as analytic spaces. Similarly, regular morphisms between varieties are interpreted as holomorphic mappings between analytic spaces. Somewhat surprisingly, it is often possible to go the other way, to interpret analytic objects in an algebraic way. 

For example, it is easy to prove that the analytic functions from the Riemann sphere to itself are either
the rational functions or the identically infinity function (an extension of Liouville's theorem). For if such a function f is nonconstant, then since the set of z where f(z) is infinity is isolated and the Riemann sphere is compact, there are finitely many  z with f(z) equal to infinity. Consider the Laurent expansion at all such z and subtract off the singular part: we are left with a function on the Riemann sphere with values in C, which by Liouville's theorem is constant. Thus f is a rational function.  This fact shows there is no essential difference between the complex projective line as an algebraic variety, or as the Riemann sphere.

 Important results 
There is a long history of comparison results between algebraic geometry and analytic geometry, beginning in the nineteenth century. Some of the more important advances are listed here in chronological order.

 Riemann's existence theorem 

Riemann surface theory shows that a compact Riemann surface has enough meromorphic functions on it, making it an algebraic curve. Under the name Riemann's existence theorem a deeper result on ramified coverings of a compact Riemann surface was known: such finite coverings as topological spaces are classified by permutation representations of the fundamental group of the complement of the ramification points. Since the Riemann surface property is local, such coverings are quite easily seen to be coverings in the complex-analytic sense. It is then possible to conclude that they come from covering maps of algebraic curves—that is, such coverings all come from finite extensions of the function field.

 The Lefschetz principle 
In the twentieth century, the Lefschetz principle, named for Solomon Lefschetz, was cited in algebraic geometry to justify the use of topological techniques for algebraic geometry over any algebraically closed field K of characteristic 0, by treating K as if it were the complex number field. An elementary form of it asserts that true statements of the first order theory of fields about C are true for any algebraically closed field K of characteristic zero. A precise principle and its proof are due to Alfred Tarski and are based in mathematical logic.

This principle permits the carrying over of some results obtained using analytic or topological methods for algebraic varieties over C to other algebraically closed ground fields of characteristic 0.

 Chow's theorem 
, proved by Wei-Liang Chow, is an example of the most immediately useful kind of comparison available. It states that an analytic subspace of complex projective space that is closed (in the ordinary topological sense) is an algebraic subvariety. This can be rephrased as "any analytic subspace of complex projective space which is closed in the strong topology is closed in the Zariski topology." This allows quite a free use of complex-analytic methods within the classical parts of algebraic geometry.

  GAGA 
Foundations for the many relations between the two theories were put in place during the early part of the 1950s, as part of the business of laying the foundations of algebraic geometry to include, for example, techniques from Hodge theory. The major paper consolidating the theory was Géometrie Algébrique et Géométrie Analytique  by Jean-Pierre Serre, now usually referred to as GAGA. It proves general results that relate classes of algebraic varieties, regular morphisms and sheaves with classes of analytic spaces, holomorphic mappings and sheaves. It reduces all of these to the comparison of categories of sheaves.

Nowadays the phrase GAGA-style result is used for any theorem of comparison, allowing passage between a category of objects from algebraic geometry, and their morphisms, to a well-defined subcategory of analytic geometry objects and holomorphic mappings.

 Formal statement of GAGA 
 Let  be a scheme of finite type over C. Then there is a topological space Xan which as a set consists of the closed points of X with a continuous inclusion map λX: Xan → X. The topology on Xan is called the "complex topology" (and is very different from the subspace topology).
 Suppose φ: X → Y is a morphism of schemes of locally finite type over C. Then there exists a continuous map φan: Xan → Yan such λY ° φan = φ ° λX.
 There is a sheaf  on Xan such that  is a ringed space and λX: Xan → X becomes a map of ringed spaces. For every φ: X → Y the map φan defined above is a mapping of analytic spaces. Furthermore, the map φ ↦ φan maps open immersions into open immersions.
 For every sheaf  on X (called algebraic sheaf) there is a sheaf  on Xan (called analytic sheaf) and a map of sheaves of -modules .
If f is proper then this map is an isomorphism. One also has isomorphisms of all higher direct image sheaves  in this case.
 Now assume that Xan is Hausdorff and compact. If  is a coherent analytic sheaf of -modules over Xan then there exists a coherent algebraic sheaf  of -modules and an isomorphism .

In slightly lesser generality, the GAGA theorem asserts that the category of coherent algebraic sheaves on a complex projective variety X and the category of coherent analytic sheaves on the corresponding analytic space Xan are equivalent. The analytic space Xan is obtained roughly by pulling back to X the complex structure from C'n through the coordinate charts. Indeed, phrasing the theorem in this manner is closer in spirit to Serre's paper, seeing how the full scheme-theoretic language that the above formal statement uses heavily had not yet been invented by the time of GAGA's publication.

Notes

References

External links
 Kiran Kedlaya. 18.726 Algebraic Geometry (LEC # 30 - 33 GAGA)Spring 2009. Massachusetts Institute of Technology: MIT OpenCourseWare Creative Commons BY-NC-SA.